Ra Mi-ran (born March 6, 1975) is a South Korean actress and television personality.

Career
Before making her film debut in Lady Vengeance (2005), Ra Mi-ran spent years acting in theatre. Afterwards, she appeared in more than 40 films but did not receive acclaim or public recognition until she starred in Dancing Queen (2012), with one review calling her "the standout" as the protagonist's best friend and hairdresser.

She is most prolific as a supporting actress, notably in Lee Joon-ik's Hope (2013), for which her portrayal of a young boy's mother won Best Supporting Actress at the 34th Blue Dragon Film Awards; as well as The Himalayas (2015), for which she won Best Supporting Actress at the 52nd Baeksang Arts Awards. She was also noted as a scene stealer in the hit cable drama Reply 1988 (2015).

Ra was also praised in her leading role as a North Korean defector in Jeon Kyu-hwan's indie 'Dance Town' (2011), with Variety calling it "riveting" and "a landmark performance."

Though the reality show 'Sister's Slam Dunk", she, along with cast members: Min Hyo Rin, Kim Sook, Hong Jin Kyung, Jessi, and Tiffany. They debuted as a girl group with the oldest average age in kpop history, under the name 'Unnies'.

Filmography

Film

Television series

Web series

Television shows

Discography

Theater
 Briquette Road (2009-2010)
 Semi-Musical (2009)
 My First Time (2009)
 Very Good Day (2008-2009)
 Romeo and Bernadette (2008)
 When I Looked the Prettiest (2008)
 The Donkey Show (2007-2008)
 Five Sketches About Love (2006-2007)
 A Midsummer's Nightmare (2006)

Awards and nominations

State honors

Listicles

Notes

References

External links

 Ra Mi-ran at C-JeS Entertainment 
 
 
 
 

1975 births
Living people
South Korean film actresses
South Korean stage actresses
South Korean musical theatre actresses
South Korean female idols
South Korean television actresses
21st-century South Korean actresses
Seoul Institute of the Arts alumni
Best Supporting Actress Paeksang Arts Award (film) winners